This is the complete list of men's Southeast Asian Games medalists in swimming.

Current program

50 metres freestyle

100 metres freestyle

200 metres freestyle

400 metres freestyle

1500 metres freestyle

50 metres backstroke

100 metres backstroke

200 metres backstroke

50 metres breaststroke

100 metres breaststroke

200 metres breaststroke

50 metres butterfly

100 metres butterfly

200 metres butterfly

Lists of swimmers